Llanyblodwel is a civil parish in Shropshire, England.  It contains 49 listed buildings that are recorded in the National Heritage List for England.  Of these, one is listed at Grade I, the highest of the three grades, one is at Grade II*, the middle grade, and the others are at Grade II, the lowest grade.  The parish contains the village of Llanyblodwel and smaller settlements, and is otherwise rural.  Most of the listed buildings are houses, farmhouses and farm buildings, many of which are timber framed and date from the 14th to the 17th century.  The other listed buildings include a church, memorials, coffins and a sundial in the churchyard, a public house, a country house and associated structures, a former toll house, nine groups of lime kilns, a smelt flue chimney, two bridges, a pump, and a war memorial.


Key

Buildings

References

Citations

Sources

Lists of buildings and structures in Shropshire